The Centre Scientifique et Technique Jean Féger, better known as CSTJF is the main technical and scientific research center of the French Oil group Total SA, situated in Pau, France.

About 2,000 people work at the site, which comprises many small-sized buildings.

It contains a big server farm to accommodate the storage and computing power required for geophysics simulations. There are Windows, Unix and Linux servers. The total storage space is more than 26 petabytes.

The facility hosts a supercomputer named PANGEA III, an IBM  POWER9 system with more than 290,000 cores; the computer has been tested to produce nearly 18 petaflops, which placed it at #15 in the June 2020 Top500 list of the world's most powerful supercomputers. It is also ranked as the world's 9th most energy-efficient supercomputer. There is a fiber optic link between here and the Tour Coupole and Tour Michelet in Paris La Défense.

The facility houses its own restaurant, and labs for research on petrol and gases. There is also a conference center capable of seating 100-200 people.

Located inside the CSTJF is the company CE (comité d'entreprise) : which lends books, CDs and DVDs to employees as well as selling tickets for concerts at reduced prices.

See also

 Total Homepage

References

Oil companies of France
Pau, Pyrénées-Atlantiques
TotalEnergies
Buildings and structures in Pyrénées-Atlantiques
Companies based in Nouvelle-Aquitaine